Billy Smiley (born October 19, 1957) is a music producer, songwriter, and musician. He is best known for being one of the core members of the Christian rock band White Heart. He was the band's guitarist and vocalist and one of the main songwriters since 1982.

After selling over 2 million albums with White Heart, Smiley turned to music production and artist development. He is credited with producing or developing such Christian acts as Geoff Moore and the Distance, Margaret Becker, Rhonda Gunn, Newsboys, and Bebe & Cece Winans. His most recent, and notable, writing and production accomplishment was earning a platinum certified album for former American Idol finalist Clay Aiken's version of Smiley's song "Merry Christmas with Love". He has teamed with classically trained baritone David Britton on two released albums and one upcoming release.

Smiley has degrees in music theory and composition from Bethel College (now Bethel University) and Azusa Pacific University.

A solo album by Smiley, New Night (1986), centers on his trumpet playing.

References

1957 births
Living people
American performers of Christian music
Musicians from Michigan
People from Farmington Hills, Michigan
White Heart members